Raising the Mammoth is Explorers Club's second album, released in 2002. It features appearances by former  Kansas members  Steve Walsh and Kerry Livgren, former Megadeth guitarist Marty Friedman and drummer Terry Bozzio. The album was mixed by longtime  Rush co-producer  Terry Brown.

Track listing
All songs by Trent Gardner.

Personnel
Steve Walsh – lead vocals
James LaBrie – lead vocals
Kerry Livgren – guitar
Marty Friedman – guitar
Gary Wehrkamp – guitar
Jeff Curtis – additional guitar
Trent Gardner - keyboards
Mark Robertson - keyboards
John Myung - bass
Hal 'Stringfellow' Imbrie - additional bass
Terry Bozzio - drums, percussion

Production
Executive producers: Peter Morticelli and Mike Varney
Produced by Trent Gardner
Engineered and Mixed by Terry Brown
Mastered by Jim Brick

References

Explorers Club (band) albums
2002 albums